"Thieves in the Temple" is a song by American musician Prince from the 1990 soundtrack album Graffiti Bridge. Added at the last minute, it was the final song recorded for the album. "Thieves in the Temple" topped the US R&B chart and became a number six hit in the US, and a number seven hit in the UK. The single also peaked at number nine on the dance chart.

The track has a unique sound, starting quietly with echoed keyboards and vocals before the main section of the song booms in with a pulsating synth bass, syncopated drum machines, Middle Eastern melodies and opera-like layered vocals. Prince also samples a harmonica solo from a recording by The Chambers Brothers. The vocals are emotional, and accuse the subject of rejecting Prince and lying to him. The "temple" in the title recalls the ever-present spirituality in many of Prince's songs. The maxi single contains extended lyrics that continue the theme before diverging into more dance-oriented material.

The maxi single also contains a Junior Vasquez remix called "Thieves in the House", which is distinctly more dance-oriented. It also contains samples from earlier Prince songs "Eye No" and "Batdance", as well as a dub version of the house track. The accompanying music video for the song was pulled from the film, but an extended video exists which mirrors the extended remix.

Critical reception
Bill Coleman from Billboard wrote, "Latest release finds the elusive Purple One returning to fine form with a catchy, solid rock-n-funk-textured pop number that bodes well for the forthcoming Graffiti Bridge package." Paul Lester from Melody Maker named it Single of the Week, commenting, "'Thieves in the Temple' is a good Prince single. Not as brilliant one (like 'If I Was Your Girlfriend', 'When Doves Cry'), not really a great one ('Pop Life', 'Alphabet Street'), but a good one all the same. Taut, muscular funk with splashes and layers and just enough detail to ensure you'll want to return to it againg and again."	David Giles from Music Week felt the song "contains few musical surprises, consisting of the usual polite funk motifs and massed harmonies."

Retrospective response
In an 2020 retrospective review, Andy Healy from Albumism stated that the song is arguably one of Prince's "strongest moments on record" and a "haunting dance track", that "hits hard with its inventive drum programming (just pay attention to the hi-hat pattern) and the layered vocals hook you straight away." He added, "Concise and packing a punch, the album version is an absolute masterpiece that is unbelievably improved upon in the extended 12" cut." 

Stephen Thomas Erlewine from AllMusic called "Thieves in the Temple" "sinewy", picking it as one of the songs that "make Graffiti Bridge a thoroughly enjoyable listen." In 2019, Alexis Petridis from The Guardian noted that "its sound is slinky and luscious, the chorus is great – but it's no When Doves Cry." In 2020, Rolling Stone described it as a "brooding, spiritual meditation on lies, rejection and soul-searching", stating that "with a Middle Eastern flavor, almost operatic vocals and an agitated feel, it was a decidedly new vibe for Prince." A reviewer from Sunday Tribune stated that "it's a great title, the song is well catchy after a few plays and Prince sings beautifully."

Track listing
 7", Paisley Park / 7-19751 (US)
"Thieves in the Temple" – 3:20
"Thieves in the Temple" (Part II) – 1:41

 12", Paisley Park / 0-21598 (US)
"Thieves in the Temple" (Remix) – 8:03
"Thieves in the House" – 6:50
"Temple House Dub" – 5:06

 also available on UK 12" picture disc (W9751TP)
 also available on CD (9 21598-2)

Charts

Weekly charts

Year-end charts

See also
List of number-one R&B singles of 1990 (U.S.)

Cover versions
Herbie Hancock recorded an instrumental version of "Thieves in the Temple" on his 1996 album The New Standard, implicitly nominating the song as a contemporary jazz standard.
Renée Geyer covered the song on her album, Tenderland (2003).
A version was also recorded by experimental band Ulver, in the style of their album Shadows of the Sun with guest vocals by Siri Stranger.
Prince's scream at the end of the song was sampled for the 1993 Eddie Murphy and Michael Jackson duet, "Whatzupwitu".

References

Prince (musician) songs
1990 singles
Songs written by Prince (musician)
Music videos directed by Prince (musician)
Paisley Park Records singles
Warner Records singles
Songs written for films
Song recordings produced by Prince (musician)
1990 songs
Cashbox number-one singles